WHFL-CD is a religious Class A low-power broadcasting television station (LPTV) in Goldsboro, North Carolina. The station formerly broadcast on UHF channel 43, and was reassigned by the FCC in 2018 to move to Channel 7 reaching Wayne County, North Carolina and portions of the six surrounding counties, all part of the Raleigh/Durham television market.  WHFL-CD carries religious programming from NRB TV National Religious Broadcasters, as well as local programming like Together Again with Barry Stallings.

References

External links
http://www.whfl.org

HFL-CD
Low-power television stations in the United States